Elazay Mountain is the biggest mountain of Mohmand Agency in Pakistan.Covered with snow from November to February, Very beautiful and famous tourist destination.

References

External links
 Picture

Mohmand District
Mountains of Pakistan